Laki is a volcanic fissure in the south of Iceland.

Laki may also refer to:

Places

Azerbaijan
 Läki or Orta Ləki, a village and municipality

Bulgaria
 Laki, Blagoevgrad Province, village in Blagoevgrad Province, Bulgaria
 Laki, Plovdiv Province, a town in Plovdiv Province, Bulgaria
 Laki Municipality, a municipality in Plovdiv Province, Bulgaria
 Laki Peak, Graham Land, Antarctica

North Macedonia
 Laki, Vinica, a village in Vinica Municipality

Poland
 Łąki, Lower Silesian Voivodeship in south-west Poland
 Łąki, Lublin Voivodeship in east Poland
 Łąki, Garwolin County in Masovian Voivodeship, east-central Poland
 Łąki, Warsaw West County in Masovian Voivodeship, east-central Poland
 Łąki, Wołomin County in Masovian Voivodeship, east-central Poland
 Łąki, West Pomeranian Voivodeship in north-west Poland

Other uses
 Laki tribe, a Kurdish tribe native to southwestern Iran
 Laki language, a Kurdish dialect.
 Laki (Mazandarani dialect)
 Laki (One Piece), a minor character in One Piece

See also
 Łąki (disambiguation)
 Ləki or Lyaki, Azerbaijan
 Zay people or Laqi, an ethnic group